Aegina was a figure of Greek mythology, the nymph of the island that bears her name, Aegina, lying in the Saronic Gulf between Attica and the Peloponnesos. The archaic Temple of Aphaea, the "Invisible Goddess", on the island was later subsumed by the cult of Athena. Aphaia (Ἀφαῖα) may be read as an attribute of Aegina that provides an epithet, or as a doublet of the goddess.

Family 
Though the name Aegina betokens a goat-nymph, such as was Cretan Amalthea, she was given a mainland identity as the daughter of the river-god Asopus and the nymph Metope; of their twelve or twenty daughters, many were ravished by Apollo or Zeus. Aegina bore at least two children: Menoetius by Actor, and Aeacus by Zeus, both of whom became kings. A certain Damocrateia, who married Menoetius, was also called her daughter by Zeus.

The mortal son Menoetius was king of Opus, and was counted among the Argonauts. His son was Patroclus, Achilles' first cousin once removed through their paternal family connection to Aegina, and his intimate companion.

The son made immortal, Aeacus, was the king of Aegina, and was known to have contributed help to Poseidon and Apollo in building the walls of Troy. Through him, Aegina was the great-grandmother of Achilles, who was son of Peleus, son of Aeacus.

In one account, Aegina was also called the mother of Sinope by Ares. Otherwise, she was usually her sister; both were daughters of Asopus.

Mythology

The Abduction of Aegina
Legend has it that Zeus took the form of an eagle (or a great flame in Ovid's telling) and abducted Aegina, taking her to an island near Attica, then called Oenone; henceforth known by her name. Aegina's father Asopus chased after them; his search took him to Corinth, where Sisyphus was king. Sisyphus, having chanced to see a great bird bearing a maiden away to a nearby island, informed Asopus. Though Asopus pursued them, Zeus threw down his thunderbolts sending Asopus back to his own waters. Aegina eventually gave birth to her son Aeacus, who became king of the island.

Myrmidons
When the city of Aegina was depopulated by a plague sent by Hera in jealous reprisal for Zeus's love of Aegina, the king Aeacus prayed to Zeus for the ants that were currently infesting an oak tree to morph into humans to repopulate his kingdom. Thus the myrmidons were created.

Gallery

Notes

References

 Apollodorus, The Library with an English Translation by Sir James George Frazer, F.B.A., F.R.S. in 2 Volumes, Cambridge, MA, Harvard University Press; London, William Heinemann Ltd. 1921. ISBN 0-674-99135-4. Online version at the Perseus Digital Library. Greek text available from the same website.
 Bell, Robert E., Women of Classical Mythology: A Biographical Dictionary. ABC-Clio. 1991. .
Diodorus Siculus, The Library of History translated by Charles Henry Oldfather. Twelve volumes. Loeb Classical Library. Cambridge, Massachusetts: Harvard University Press; London: William Heinemann, Ltd. 1989. Vol. 3. Books 4.59–8. Online version at Bill Thayer's Web Site
 Diodorus Siculus, Bibliotheca Historica. Vol 1-2. Immanel Bekker. Ludwig Dindorf. Friedrich Vogel. in aedibus B. G. Teubneri. Leipzig. 1888–1890. Greek text available at the Perseus Digital Library.
 Pindar, Odes translated by Diane Arnson Svarlien. 1990. Online version at the Perseus Digital Library.
 Pindar, The Odes of Pindar including the Principal Fragments with an Introduction and an English Translation by Sir John Sandys, Litt.D., FBA. Cambridge, MA., Harvard University Press; London, William Heinemann Ltd. 1937. Greek text available at the Perseus Digital Library.
 Publius Ovidius Naso, Metamorphoses translated by Brookes More (1859-1942). Boston, Cornhill Publishing Co. 1922. Online version at the Perseus Digital Library.
 Publius Ovidius Naso, Metamorphoses. Hugo Magnus. Gotha (Germany). Friedr. Andr. Perthes. 1892. Latin text available at the Perseus Digital Library.

Further reading 
Robert Graves, The Greek Myths (1955) 1960, 66.b.1; 67.f; 138.b.
Edith Hamilton, Mythology (1940) 1942 Mentor

External links

Nymphs
Divine women of Zeus
Children of Asopus
Women of Ares
Aeginetan characters in Greek mythology